Alta Valsugana e Bersntol (German: Hoch Suganertal und Fersental; Mocheno: Hoa Valzegu' ont Bersntol)  is one of the sixteen districts of Trentino in the Italian region of Trentino-Alto Adige/Südtirol. Its administrative seat and major town is Pergine Valsugana.

Overview 
The territory consist more or less of the high part of Valsugana, from border of Trento municipality (west) to Novaledo (east), and all the Bersntol valley.

Alta Valsugana e Bersntol district borders west with Val d'Adige (15), south with Vallagarina (10) and with Altipiani Cimbri (12), east with Valsugana e Tesino (3) and north with Val di Fiemme and Valle di Cembra (5).

Subdivisions 

 Dati Provincia TN (Italian)
 Popolazione al 01-01-2010 (Italian)

See also 
Valsugana
Districts of Trentino-Alto Adige/Südtirol

References

External links 
 Visit Valsugana
 Comprensorio Alta Valsugana

Districts of Trentino
States and territories established in 2006